The Marshall Suite is a 1999 album by the Fall, their 20th. The album builds on the techno-influenced beats of its predecessor Levitate (1997), while also returning to a more rockabilly-influenced sound reminiscent of earlier Fall lineups with songs such as the catchy "Touch Sensitive" and the strange, complex, thumping jungle beats of "The Crying Marshal". The album was long out of print, but a new three-disc edition was released in the summer of 2011.

Background
The Marshall Suite was made immediately after an American tour during which Mark E. Smith had an onstage fight with members of the band and was arrested following ongoing altercations at the hotel at which the group were staying. While the remaining band members quit and returned to England, leaving Smith in a cell in Manhattan, Julia Nagle chose to stay in the band, helping to assemble the group's new lineup. During the recording of the album, this new lineup was still taking shape; the group shed a drummer before recording could even begin, and the album features two different bassists. For these reasons, it is something of a patchwork: of 13 tracks, "On My Own" is a reworking of the previous album's "Everybody But Myself", three tracks are covers, two are sound collages, and "The Crying Marshal" is a remix by producer Steven Hitchcock of a Smith collaboration with the Filthy Three ("Real Life of the Crying Marshal"). Two songs use some of the same lyrics (a 14th track, "Tom Raggazzi", a reggae-tinged reprise of "Anecdotes...", was included on the vinyl version). Nevertheless, the album was well-received.

Around the time of the album's release, rumours circulated that The Marshall Suite was a concept album about the "Crying Marshal" character. Smith stopped short of denying this, telling The Wire that "I thought it would be good to do it as the story of his life, a themed LP, with a thread running through it. It's such an unhip thing to do." An unpublished section of the interview, later placed on the magazine's website, suggested that Smith was not yet finished with his creation: "I do want to continue the Marshall theme, develop it. Maybe a five-sided thing next, the return of the Marshall". However, he does not appear to have returned to the theme on any subsequent Fall album.

The first of the album's three covers, "F-'Oldin' Money", which Smith described as "half a cover ... based on a piece of rockabilly," is a 1959 track by American rockabilly singer Tommy Blake. "Bound" is originally a 1974 soul instrumental by The Audio Arts Strings titled "Love Bound", to which Smith added lyrics. The third cover, "This Perfect Day", was first released by Australian punk band the Saints in 1977.

An edit of the album's opening track "Touch Sensitive" was used in the UK as a soundtrack to an advert for the Vauxhall Corsa.

Track listing

CD version

Vinyl version
*Note: writing credits as per original vinyl edition.

2011 reissue 
Disc 1
1-13: as per original CD

Disc 2

Note
 "Antidote" is the same track as "(Jung Nev's) Antidotes" on The Marshall Suite album.

Disc 3 (Live show for XFM Radio, 14 April 1999)

Personnel
The Fall
 Mark E. Smith – vocals, keyboards, guitar, bass guitar on "Tom Ragazzi (Finale)"
 Julia Nagle – keyboards, guitar, programming
 Neville Wilding – guitar, vocals
 Adam Helal – bass guitar
 Karen Leatham – bass guitar; keyboards on Peel session #22
 Tom Head – drums
Additional personnel
 Steve Hitchcock - string arrangements
 Steve Hanley - bass on Peel session #21 
 Karl Burns - drums on Peel session #21
 John Rolleson - backing vocals on Peel session #21
 Speth Hughes - special effects on Peel session #22
Technical
 Mark E. Smith – production
 Steve Hitchcock - production
 Elspeth Hughes - engineering 
 Jim Brumby - engineering
 Richard Flack - engineering
 Pascal Le Gras - photography
 Warne/Trustam - design
 Mike Robinson - production on Peel session #21
 Nick Scripps - engineering on Peel session #21
 Mike Engles - production on Peel session #¤22
 Kevin Rumble - engineering on Peel session #22
 Andy Pierce - remastering (2011 reissue)

Notes

References

External links
 A web page with photos, relating to the album The Marshall Suite from Invisiblegirl.co.uk
 Lyrics

1999 albums
The Fall (band) albums